YOLO is an adult animated television series created and directed by Michael Cusack for Adult Swim. The series is loosely adaptated from Cusack's web series of the same name. The first season, entitled YOLO: Crystal Fantasy premiered on August 10, 2020; the pilot was aired on April 1, 2020 as a part of Adult Swim's annual April Fools' Day event alongside another project of Cusack's, Smiling Friends. A second season titled YOLO: Silver Destiny was slated to air on January 16, 2023 on Adult Swim but was delayed to January 23, 2023.

The series follows the adventures of friends Rachel and Sarah as they travel through Australia.

Voice cast

Main 
Sarah Bishop as Sarah
Todor Manojlovic as Rachel / additional voices 
Michael Cusack as Lucas the Magnificent / additional voices

Guest 

 Michelle Brasier as Miki
 Jarrad Wright as Pink Wizard
 Naomi Higgins as Maddison
 Greta Lee Jackson as Donna
 Flying Lotus as himself

Episodes

Series overview

Season 1: Crystal Fantasy (2020)

Season 2: Silver Destiny (2023)

References

Notes

External links
 

2020 American television series debuts
2020s Australian animated television series
Australian adult animated comedy television series
2020s American adult animated television series
2020s American animated comedy television series
Adult Swim original programming
American adult animated comedy television series
American flash adult animated television series
Australian flash animated television series
Television series created by Michael Cusack
English-language television shows
Television series by Williams Street
Television shows set in Australia